Magdalena Channel is a Chilean channel joining the Strait of Magellan with the Cockburn Channel and is part of a major navigation route which ultimately connects with the Beagle Channel. It separates Capitán Aracena Island from the westernmost portion of Isla Grande de Tierra del Fuego, and crosses Alberto de Agostini National Park. It is flanked by mountains, the chief of which is Monte Sarmiento. Like the Abra Channel and the Bárbara Channel farther west, it joins the western part of the Strait of Magellan directly to the Pacific Ocean.

See also
Fjords and channels of Chile
List of fjords, channels, sounds and straits of Chile
List of islands of Chile

References

Straits of Chile
Bodies of water of Magallanes Region